The original version of  was a professional wrestling world heavyweight championship owned by the New Japan Pro-Wrestling (NJPW) promotion. "IWGP" is the initialism of NJPW's governing body, the International Wrestling Grand Prix.

The title was introduced in 1983 for the winner of the IWGP League 1983. Since then, the championship was defended annually against the winner of the IWGP League of the year. The 1987–2021 IWGP Heavyweight Championship debuted in 1987 (replacing this version) and was defended regularly; the original IWGP belt was kept in use until 1997.

Title history
The inaugural champion was determined in the 1983 edition of the IWGP League, a 10-man round-robin tournament. Wrestlers from several promotions worldwide participated. Participants included World Heavyweight Champions from other international promotions (such as Canek, at the time UWA World Heavyweight Champion or Otto Wanz, at the time CWA World Heavyweight Champion).

Hulk Hogan won the tournament, after beating Antonio Inoki via knockout. As a result, Hogan became the first IWGP Heavyweight Champion in this format.

Since then, the championship was defended annually against the winner of the IWGP League of the year.
Antonio Inoki won the title in 1984. Inoki successfully defended it in 1985 against Andrè the Giant (IWGP League winner of 1985) and Hulk Hogan. Hogan was the only challenger that didn't win the tournament to challenge for the championship.

In 1986, Inoki vacated the title, because he wanted to compete in the IWGP League. Therefore, the 1986 edition was the first to crown a new Champion since the 1983 edition. Inoki won the 1986 League, and became champion for the second time.

In 1987, the title was deactivated and replaced by a new version of IWGP Heavyweight Championship (active between 1987 and 2021), which was awarded to the winner of the IWGP League 1987. The new championship was defended regularly, rather than as part of a tournament. Its lineage does not acknowledge the champions of the original title.

Reigns

Combined reigns

References

External links
njpw.co.jp

New Japan Pro-Wrestling championships
World heavyweight wrestling championships